Love Grenade is the 13th solo studio album by American rock and roll musician Ted Nugent. It was released on September 4, 2007. It was recorded at DRS Studios in Waco, Texas. Sales figures, however, have been low, with the album only selling 360,000 copies in its first week, landing it at No. 186 on the Billboard 200.

The album features of new version of the song "Journey to the Center of the Mind", a hit for Nugent's 1960s group The Amboy Dukes.

The pre-release cover art drew some controversy, as it depicts a naked woman bound and bent over on a large platter, with a grenade in her mouth. Eagle Records pulled the planned cover, and instead released a milder design featuring a hand grenade with a pink ribbon affixed.

Track listing
"Love Grenade" – 5:03
"Still Raising Hell" – 3:21
"Funk U" – 4:00
"Girl Scout Cookies" – 4:03
"Journey to the Center of the Mind" – 4:21
"Geronimo & Me" – 4:44
"EagleBrother" (instrumental) – 4:38
"Spirit of the Buffalo" – 7:29
"Aborigine" – 3:22
"Stand" – 2:43
"Broadside" – 3:36
"Bridge over Troubled Daughters" – 3:36
"Lay with Me" – 6:23

All songs written and arranged by Ted Nugent, except "Journey to the Center of the Mind", written by Steve Farmer/Ted Nugent.

Reception

Critical reception of the album was mixed to negative. Stephen Thomas Erlewine of AllMusic declared the album "sterile" and representing "the same old hard rock that Nugent has been cranking out for over three decades now, and it sure sounds like he's been doing it that long, as the riffs are recycled, the production is too clean, and the performances too professional."

Personnel
Band members
 Ted Nugent – guitars,  lead vocals, producer
 Barry Sparks – bass guitar (except "Love Grenade", "Spirit of the Buffalo" and "Lay with Me")
 Tommy Clufetos – drums

Additional musicians
 Jack Blades – bass guitar on "Love Grenade", "Spirit of the Buffalo" and "Lay with Me", background vocals, producer
 Eric Martin, Will Evankovich, April Grisman, Amber Morris, Tommy Shaw – background vocals

Production
 Chris Manning, Matt Cohen – engineers
 Steven Rosas, Kayla Rosas – pre-production recording engineers
 Juan J. Orteaga – mixing
 Dave Donnelly – mastering
 John Rios – disc artwork
 James & Maryln Brown – live photos
 Nick Zimba – Little Kid with big grenade photo
 Neil Zlozower – Platter girl photo
 Peter Tsakiris – package design & layout

References

2007 albums
Ted Nugent albums
Eagle Records albums